Delhi–Multan road, an ancient route had existed since the time of king Ashoka or earlier, was renovated by the Sur Empire ruler Sher Shah Suri (1486–1545) in order to improve transit in the areas between Delhi and Multan, leading to Kandahar and Herat in Afghanistan, eventually to Mashhad capital of Khorasan province of Iran, providing access to capital city Ashgabat of Turkmenistan."

Messaging System

There were small posts every few miles where horses were ready to receive messages to send from one post to another. Messages from the Delhi court were reaching Multan, which was around 500 miles away, within days.

Route 
On the Indian side, it passed through Rohtak, Meham, Asigarh Fort at Hansi, Firoz Shah Palace Complex at Hisar, Fatehabad, Ratia, Bhatinda and Malout, etc.  

On the Pakistani side, the road goes through the cities Lahore, Nankana Sahab, Harapa, Chichawatni, Tulamba, Makhdumpur, Kabirwala and finally Multan. Sher Shah also built a fort in Tulamba City to make a strong Communication path from Multan to Delhi

In Afghanistan, from Multan it led to Kandhar and then on to Herat.

In Iran, from Herat it led to capital city Mashhad of Khorasan province of Iran.

In Turkmenistan, from Mashhad it eventually led to capital city Ashgabat of Turkmenistan.

See also 
 Grand Trunk Road

References 

Historic trails and roads in India
History of transport in Pakistan
Roads in Pakistan
Roads in Punjab, Pakistan
Roads in Punjab, India
Transport in Delhi
Transport in Multan